Grabina may refer to the following places:
Grabina, Łask County in Łódź Voivodeship (central Poland)
Grabina, Łódź East County in Łódź Voivodeship (central Poland)
Grabina, Poddębice County in Łódź Voivodeship (central Poland)
Grabina, Lesser Poland Voivodeship (south Poland)
Grabina, Świętokrzyskie Voivodeship (south-central Poland)
Grabina, Białobrzegi County in Masovian Voivodeship (east-central Poland)
Grabina, Garwolin County in Masovian Voivodeship (east-central Poland)
Grabina, Kozienice County in Masovian Voivodeship (east-central Poland)
Grabina, Gmina Halinów in Masovian Voivodeship (east-central Poland)
Grabina, Gmina Mińsk Mazowiecki in Masovian Voivodeship (east-central Poland)
Grabina, Płock County in Masovian Voivodeship (east-central Poland)
Grabina, Gmina Kowala in Masovian Voivodeship (east-central Poland)
Grabina, Gmina Skaryszew in Masovian Voivodeship (east-central Poland)
Grabina, Warsaw West County in Masovian Voivodeship (east-central Poland)
Grabina, Koło County in Greater Poland Voivodeship (west-central Poland)
Grabina, Gmina Ostrowite in Greater Poland Voivodeship (west-central Poland)
Grabina, Gmina Zagórów in Greater Poland Voivodeship (west-central Poland)
Grabina, Silesian Voivodeship (south Poland)
Grabina, Opole Voivodeship (south-west Poland)
Grabina, West Pomeranian Voivodeship (north-west Poland)

See also